Norman Krieger is an American pianist and a professor at the Jacobs School of Music at Indiana University. He is a recipient of numerous prizes, including one from the Paderewski Foundation. He studied under the guidance of Esther Lipton in Los Angeles. By the age of 15, he obtained a scholarship from the Juilliard School, where he was educated by Adele Marcus. He was Alfred Brendel's and Maria Curcio's student in London, and he obtained an artist's diploma from the New England Conservatory. By 2011 he became a professor of music at the USC Thornton. He has collaborated with such musicians as Sheri Greenawald, Livia Sohn and Jian Wang as well as both Tokyo and Manhattan String Quartets. He also was invited to the Lincoln Center for the Performing Arts and was a frequent participant at the Mostly Mozart Festival. He has recorded two Johannes Brahms concertos, which he has also performed with the Arkansas Symphony Orchestra.

References

Living people
Juilliard School alumni
University of Southern California alumni
New England Conservatory alumni
Indiana University faculty
American male pianists
21st-century American pianists
21st-century American male musicians
Year of birth missing (living people)